Mark McMillan (born 17 May 1983 in Stirling, Scotland) is a former rugby union player who played for Bath Rugby, London Wasps and Leeds Carnegie in the Aviva Premiership, and Glasgow Warriors in the Pro14. During his time at Wasps, he helped them win both the Heineken Cup and the English Premiership, coming off the bench in both finals. At Leeds he also won the 2004–05 Powergen Cup.

He was called up to the senior Scotland training squad in October 2008, however he was ultimately not capped at that level.

McMillan's position of choice is as at scrum-half.

Honours
Powergen Cup/Anglo-Welsh Cup titles: 1
2005
Heineken Cup titles: 1 
2006–07
Premiership titles: 1 
2007–08

References

External links
Wasps profile
Glasgow Profile

1983 births
Living people
Scottish rugby union players
Wasps RFC players
Bath Rugby players
Glasgow Warriors players
Rugby union players from Stirling
Scotland 'A' international rugby union players
Rugby union scrum-halves